The 216th Coastal Division was an infantry division of the Royal Italian Army during World War II. Royal Italian Army coastal divisions were second line divisions formed with reservists and equipped with second rate materiel. They were often commanded by officers called out of retirement.

History 
The division was activated on 10 August 1943 in Pisa by expanding the XV Coastal Brigade. The division was assigned to II Army Corps and had its headquarter in Pisa. The division was responsible for the coastal defense of the coast of northern Tuscany from the mouth of the river Parmignola to Cap San Vincenzo in San Vincenzo.

After the announcement of the Armistice of Cassibile on 8 September 1943 the division, which was still in the process of forming, was disbanded by invading German forces.

Organization 
 216th Coastal Division, in Pisa
 12th Coastal Regiment
 2x Coastal battalions
 13th Coastal Regiment
 3x Coastal battalions
 3rd Coastal Artillery Regiment
 VII Coastal Artillery Group
 VIII Coastal Artillery Group
 XV Coastal Artillery Group
 522nd Machine Gun Company
 523rd Machine Gun Company
 602nd Machine Gun Company
 198th Anti-paratroopers Unit
 202nd Anti-paratroopers Unit
 204th Anti-paratroopers Unit
 III Platoon/ 4th Special Engineers Company
 216th Carabinieri Section
 Field Post Office
 Division Services

Commanding officers 
The division's commanding officers were:

 Generale di Brigata Carlo Ceriana-Mayneri (10 August 1943 - 9 September 1943

References 

 
 

 
Coastal divisions of Italy
Infantry divisions of Italy in World War II